Napier Girls' High School is a state secondary school on Clyde Road, Napier, New Zealand. It is one of the oldest schools in New Zealand for girls, and has a current school roll of about 1000.

History 
In July 1883 plans were submitted to the board of governors for a school for girls in Napier, and the following month the board advertised for a lady principal who would be required to teach English, Latin, French and Mathematics and take charge of the boarding establishment. Miss Mary Hewett was appointed, and the school opened on 29 January 1884. The original school course included English, French, Latin, German, Drawing, Singing and Calisthenics. Thirty-nine pupils were on the books that first day, and one boarder was enrolled.

The original school building had classrooms on the ground floor, and rooms for the boarders upstairs. It stood where the main hostel building, Hewett House, now stands. It was badly damaged in the 1931 Hawke's Bay earthquake, and had to be demolished. The main building of the present school, named Spencer Building after Miss A.E.J. Spencer, the school's third principal, stands in what was the original playing area of the first school.

The entrance to the school hall features a large mural painting by renowned New Zealand artist, Rita Angus.

Hewett House provides boarding accommodation for 160 boarders adjacent to the school, including five day and seven day stay. The girls are housed in double cubicles or dormitories, and some have single rooms. Matthews House accommodation opened in 1988, and contains single cubicles for senior girls.

Notable alumnae 

 Amy Hutchinson (1874 – 1971), school hostel matron, spinner and weaver, community leader.
 Jacquie Sturm (1927–2009), poet and writer of short stories
 Emma Twigg (1987-), rower
 Mandy Boyd (1991-), lawn bowls player

Notable faculty 

 Katherine Browning, (1864–1946), former mathematics teacher and notable published scientist
 June Clifford CNZM, (retired 2008), former Head of Music and chair of Chamber Music New Zealand

References

External links 
Napier Girls' High School

Boarding schools in New Zealand
Girls' schools in New Zealand
Educational institutions established in 1884
Secondary schools in the Hawke's Bay Region
Schools in Napier, New Zealand
1884 establishments in New Zealand
Alliance of Girls' Schools Australasia